Kisberény is a village in Somogy county, Hungary. It was the only settlement in the 18th and 19th century in Somogy County with a Serbian majority.

External links 
 Street map

References 

Populated places in Somogy County